"Choreography for Copy Machine (Photocopy Cha Cha)" is a four-minute animated film by independent filmmaker Chel White. All of the film's images were created solely by using the unique photographic capabilities of a photocopier to generate sequential pictures of hands, faces, and other body parts. It achieves a ghostly, dream-like aesthetic with elements of the sensual and the absurd. Completed in 1991, it is widely considered the first noteworthy animated film using this technique. 

For the film, Chel White developed a customized set up that could achieve the level of detail he was looking for in the images. After removing the platen cover, four side lights were added along with a top light that would shine through a sheet of frosted glass, allowing for his subject peoples’ silhouettes to be visible. In order to avoid potential eye damage from the bright light of the scanner, he instructed his subjects not to open their eyes as they were being scanned. Instead, White painted eyes on their eyelids.

The Berlin International Film Festival describes it as “a swinging essay about physiognomy in the age of photo-mechanical reproduction. Filmfest DC calls it, "true art in the age of mechanical reproduction; a rhythmic celebration of a photocopier’s cinematic potential." The Dallas Observer says, "(The film) takes a game we've all played with our hands, faces, and other body parts and raises it to the sublime." The Austin Chronicle writes, "(the film) pulses with a grinding sort of ghostly sexuality.” Alive TV says, "Your relationship to your copy machine may never be the same.” And The Washington Post describes the film as a “musical frolic which wittily builds on ghostly, distorted images crossing the plate glass of a copier.” Using the alias Citizen M, the music is by Chel White.

Awards/Film Festivals
Best Animated Short Film - 1992 Ann Arbor Film Festival
Gold Plaque - 1992 Chicago International Film Festival
First Place - 1992 USA Film Festival
Official Selection - 1991 Rotterdam International Film Festival
Official Selection - 1992 Berlin International Film Festival
Special Program - 2001 Sundance Film Festival

References

External links
 
 

1990s American animated films
1991 films
Xerox art
American animated short films